The Reinhardt Eagles are the athletic teams that represent Reinhardt University, located in Waleska, Georgia, in intercollegiate sports as a member of the National Association of Intercollegiate Athletics (NAIA), primarily competing in the Appalachian Athletic Conference (AAC) since the 2009–10 academic year. They were also a member of the National Christian College Athletic Association (NCCAA), primarily competing as an independent in the South Region of the Division I level from 1999–2000 to 2000–01. The Eagles previously competed in the Southern States Athletic Conference (SSAC; formerly known as Georgia–Alabama–Carolina Conference (GACC) until after the 2003–04 school year) from 2000–01 (when they joined the NAIA) to 2008–09. Prior joining the NAIA, Reinhardt was also a member of the National Junior College Athletic Association (NJCAA) and of the National Small College Athletic Association (NSCAA) until after the 1998–99 school year.

Varsity teams
Reinhardt competes in 24 intercollegiate varsity sports: Men's sports include baseball, basketball, cross country, football, golf, lacrosse, soccer, tennis, track & field (indoor and outdoor) and wrestling; while women's sports include basketball, cross country, flag football, golf, lacrosse, soccer, softball, tennis, track & field (indoor and outdoor) and volleyball; and co-ed sports include cheerleading. Former sports included men's and women's bowling.

Football 
After dropping their football program in 1920, Reinhardt revived football in 2013 as a member of the Mid-South Conference (MSC).

Accomplishments 

In 2010, Reinhardt University's Drew Tyson became the first baseball player drafted by the Oakland Athletics, in the 17th round of the MLB draft. In 2014, Reinhardt was invited to the NAIA Men's basketball national tournament for the first time since 2004, when the team won a conference championship for the second consecutive year.

The RU men's lacrosse team won their third-straight NAIA National Invitational Tournament championship in 2019.

References

External links